Anne Carlisle (born 1956) is an American actress, performance artist, acting teacher, author, and model.

Career
She is known for co-writing and playing both the lead female and male counterpart roles in the film Liquid Sky. She also played a minor role of Victoria in the 1985 Susan Seidelman film Desperately Seeking Susan, the cross dresser prostitute Gwendoline in Crocodile Dundee and starred in an episode of TV series Miami Vice. Carlisle also adapted and wrote a novel version of her cult, new wave film Liquid Sky.

Carlisle posed for Playboy in 1984.

In 2014 in an interview with The Awl it was confirmed by Liquid Sky director Slava Tsukerman, a sequel, Liquid Sky 2, was in the works. Anne Carlisle would be returning in the sequel in the role of Margaret.

Filmography
 New York Beat Movie (1981) (as Ann Carlyle) as Fashion Show Model
 Liquid Sky (1982) as Margaret and Jimmy
 Perfect Strangers (1984) as Sally
 Desperately Seeking Susan (1985) as Victoria
 Miami Vice as Lydia Sugarman (1 episode, 1986)
 Crocodile Dundee (1986) as Gwendoline
 The Suicide Club (1988) as Catherine
 Bum Rap (1988) as Grace
 High Score (1990) as Olympia
 Downtown 81 (2000) as Fashion Show Model

References

External links 
 

1956 births
American film actresses
American television actresses
Drama teachers
Living people
21st-century American women